Jose Gonçalves Heleno (3 November 1927 – 1 September 2021) was a Brazilian Roman Catholic prelate. He was first appointed a coadjutor bishop of the Roman Catholic Diocese of Governador Valadares from 1976 to 1977. He then served as the Bishop of Governador Valadares from 7 December 1977 until his retirement on 25 April 2001.

Biography
Gonçalves Heleno was born in Cipotânea, Minas Gerais, Brazil, on 3 November 1927 to José Francisco Heleno and wife Maria Francisca de Almeida. He was the brother of Hélio Gonçalves Heleno (1935–2012), who served as the Bishop of the Roman Catholic Diocese of Caratinga from 1978 to 2011.

Gonçalves Heleno died in Caratinga on 1 September 2021, at the age of 93. He had lived in Caratinga for approximately 20 years following a stroke. He was buried next to his brother at the São João Batista Cathedral in Caratinga on 1 September 2021.

References

1927 births
2021 deaths
Brazilian Roman Catholic bishops
Roman Catholic bishops of Governador Valadares
20th-century Roman Catholic bishops in Brazil
21st-century Roman Catholic bishops in Brazil
People from Minas Gerais